Lake View is a city in Phillips County, Arkansas, United States. The population was 443 at the 2010 census. Because there is also a Lakeview in Baxter County, many residents want to rename Lakeview to "Lake Helena". The original settlement name was "Turkey Scratch" from the 1850s to the official declaration of the town's namesake was in the 1920s. When the town was re-established in 1937, Lake View became one of three communities in Arkansas to be reserved for black farm families by the Resettlement Administration. It is one of the few communities in the U.S. with an African-American percentage at over 90 percent of the populations.

Geography

Demographics

As of the census of 2000, there were 531 people, 177 households, and 136 families residing in the city. The racial makeup of the city was 7.16% White, 91.71% African American, and 1.13% from two or more races. Hispanic or Latino of any race were 0.19% of the population.

There were 177 households, out of which 38.4% had children under the age of 18 living with them, 29.4% were married couples living together, 41.2% had a female householder with no husband present, and 22.6% were non-families. 20.3% of all households were made up of individuals, and 9.6% had someone living alone who was 65 years of age or older.  The average household size was 3.00 and the average family size was 3.47.

In the city, the population was spread out, with 35.8% under the age of 18, 9.2% from 18 to 24, 21.8% from 25 to 44, 21.3% from 45 to 64, and 11.9% who were 65 years of age or older.  The median age was 30 years. For every 100 females, there were 72.4 males.  For every 100 females age 18 and over, there were 73.1 males.

The median income for a household in the city was $15,536, and the median income for a family was $16,944. Males had a median income of $17,031 versus $14,444 for females. The per capita income for the city was $13,651.  About 45.2% of families and 45.6% of the population were below the poverty line, including 57.4% of those under age 18 and 40.6% of those age 65 or over.

Education 
The Barton–Lexa School District provides early childhood, elementary and secondary education to more than 800 students in prekindergarten through grade 12 at is two schools. Students complete their studies at Barton High School.

It was previously served by the Lake View School District, which operated Lake View Elementary School (K-6) and C. V. White High School (7-12). On July 1, 2004 it was consolidated into the Barton-Lexa School District.

References

Cities in Arkansas
Cities in Phillips County, Arkansas
New Deal subsistence homestead communities